The Chicago mayoral election of 1873 saw People's Party (campaigning under the label "Democratic People's Union") candidate Harvey Doolittle Colvin defeated Citizen's Union (campaigning under the label "Law and Order") candidate Lester Legrant Bond by a landslide nearly 34-point margin. Bond was the incumbent acting mayor, having taken office due to the extended absence of Joseph Medill.

The election took place on November 7.

Bond was endorsed by all of the city's major newspapers, with the exception of the Chicago Times.

The defeat of Bond led to the dissolution of the Chicago-based Citizen's Union Party.

Results

References

Mayoral elections in Chicago
Chicago
Chicago
1870s in Chicago